The Legend-class cutter, also known as the National Security Cutter (NSC) and Maritime Security Cutter, Large, is the largest active patrol cutter class of the United States Coast Guard. Entering into service in 2008, the Legend-class is the largest of several new cutter designs developed as part of the Integrated Deepwater System Program.

Mission
These vessels can be used for a variety of tasks, including environmental protection, search and rescue, fisheries protection, ports, waterways, and coastal security, counterterrorism activities, law enforcement, drug interdiction, defense operations, and other military/naval operations, including assigned naval warfare tasks with the U.S. Navy.

Design
The Legend-class cutters are the second-longest of all U.S. Coast Guard cutters, behind the research icebreaker , and will replace the 12 Hamilton-class cutters in service. These cutters are envisioned by the Coast Guard as being able to undertake the entire range of the high-endurance cutter roles with additional upgrades to make it more of an asset to the Department of Defense during declared national emergency contingencies. To facilitate intercept missions, the Legend-class can carry and launch both the Short Range Prosecutor and the Long Range Interceptor rigid-hulled inflatable boats (RHIBs). The cutters are configured to be able to survive in low-threat environments, factors of which include an enemy having a poorly equipped military, some coastal patrol craft, and few to no anti-ship cruise missiles. Operations in this environment can also be general defense operations, including theater security, port protection, ship escort, anti-piracy, and maritime interception operations. The cutters can also survive in medium-threat environments, which can include a fairly well equipped military of ships and aircraft with weapons and radar coverage well offshore, higher numbers of anti-ship cruise missiles, and a possible submarine threat. Operations in this threat environment could include defense operations, naval surface fire support, and the evacuation of noncombatants. The cutters are not expected to survive in a high-threat environment with their current configuration.

The cutter has a rear-launching ramp, capable of launching and retrieving the two aft-stored RHIBs while underway. The NSC is built to about 90% military standards. The NSC is constructed with a steel hull and steel superstructure with steel bulkheads. Ballistic protection is provided for the main gun, and the cutter's crew-served weapons can have steel ballistic shields attached for protection. The NSC is equipped with a state-of-the-art damage-control system that contributes to the ship's survivability. The NSC is designed to U.S. Navy damage stability criteria and to level-1 survivability standards. Most of the NSC design is compatible with ABS naval vessel rules. The NSC has degaussing capability. The cutters have a reduced radar cross-section, which gives the cutters a higher degree of stealth over the past cutters. The NSC uses a modified version of the same stealthy mast design as the Arleigh Burke-class destroyers.

Combat suite
Legend-class cutters have increased data exchange bandwidth. The Hensoldt (formerly EADS North America) TRS-3D radar system provides three-dimensional air and surface search functions, and is used in the LCS program and as the German Korvette 130 program.  The cutters are also equipped with the AN/SLQ-32(V)2 electronic warfare system used in the DDG-51 class. The cutters AN/SLQ-32B(V)2 system is to be upgraded under the Surface Electronic Warfare Improvement Program (SEWIP). The Legend-class is equipped with the same 220 rpm Bofors 57 mm gun as mounted on the USN's Littoral combat ships. Guided 57 mm ammunition is being developed for the Mk 110 for the Navy and Coast Guard, including for use on the National Security cutters. The missile defense duties are handled by the MK 53 NULKA decoy systems, the MK 36 SRBOC countermeasure systems also used on the FFG-7 and CG-47 programs, and the Phalanx CIWS. The combination of the Mk 110 and the Phalanx gives the cutters anti-surface capability, limited air-defense capability, and the capability to provide naval gunfire support. The cutters have space, weight, and power reserved for additional weapons and systems, which includes mine-warfare systems, non line-of-sight missiles, and can have a SeaRAM replace the 20mm Phalanx CIWS. The NSC is capable of carrying a sonar that is reported as having mine and underwater swimmer location ability. The NSC has an NBC detection and defense system to repel chemical, biological, or radiological attacks and has wash-down systems. The cutter's weapons, command and control suite can be upgraded and is hardened to survive potential attacks and process increased data flow.

History

The first NSC, entered sea trials in February 2008. She has been in service since August 2008, and is based at Coast Guard Island, Alameda, California. A second NSC, is also based in Alameda in 2010. The vessel was christened by first lady Michelle Obama on 23 July 2010, and released to the custody of the Coast Guard on 2 September 2011. She is now in service in Alameda. Construction on the fourth NSC, began in 2011. The fleet mix analysis phase- study in December 2009 called for nine NSCs, but eight ships are in the Program of Record, and only seven hulls have been funded as of the FY2013-2017 capital investment plan. The NSCs proved their capability to perform naval operations during the 2012 RIMPAC exercises, where the  detected and tracked missile threats and also provided naval gunfire support for troops ashore during the training exercise, demonstrating the capability of moving with other naval forces and being able to perform other defense operations.

Program issues
On 7 July 2009, the Government Accountability Office reported that delays in the NSC program are likely to result in "the loss of thousands of cutter operational days for conducting missions through 2017." The GAO also reported that month that problems in the NSC program have delayed the OPC program by five years. The program was also plagued by structural issues; the Coast Guard historically uses its cutters extensively, typically 180 days at sea a year, furthering the problem this will often be in North Pacific and North Atlantic waters that are some of the roughest seas in the Northern Hemisphere. As such, the stresses on the cutters are expected to be very severe. Structural analysis showed that some parts of the cutter could be expected to survive only 3 years. This has been addressed in cutter 752 on, with the first two cutters receiving reinforcements later. WMSL-752, the Stratton, suffered corrosion and leaks within weeks of commissioning in 2012. Earlier ships have not had that problem, so it may be the result of the cathodic protection system being hooked up in reverse. The first NSC, the Bertholf, has had structural enhancements put into place to fix reports of fatigue life issues; the second NSC, Waesche, had structural enhancement work completed in September 2018. The cutter Stratton and all subsequent NSCs have the enhancements already installed.

The delays and problems have led to cost increases. The latest USCG estimate for eight ships is $5.474billion for an average cost of $684million; the first six hulls cost $3.902billion for an average of $650million/ship. The sixth NSC cost $735million in FY2012-13. In the FY18 Homeland Security Appropriations Bill released on the 21 November 2017, funding for the 10th NSC at a cost of $540million and long lead items for the 11th NSC was proposed. The FY2018 Omnibus Appropriations Bill includes $1.24billion in funding for the NSC program. The bill contains funding for the construction of the 10th National Security Cutter (NSC), long-lead-time materials for the 11th NSC, and construction of the 11th NSC. The Department of Homeland Security Appropriations Act, 2020 makes available $100.5million for long lead-time material for a 12th cutter.

In January 2018, a whistleblower lawsuit against Lockheed Martin was unsealed, alleging that the company had sold defective communications systems to the NSC program. The qui tam lawsuit, filed by a former Lockheed employee, said Lockheed had concealed known problems with the radio-frequency distribution systems installed on nine NSCs, preventing them from simultaneously transmitting and receiving multiple radio signals. To settle the lawsuit, Lockheed agreed to pay the federal government $2.2million and to provide repairs valued at $2.2million to the faulty systems.

Variants
 
Huntington Ingalls Industries has proposed two "patrol frigates" for Navy use, based on the NSC hull.

Patrol Frigate 4501 is very similar to the NSC, the main differences being a modified stern ramp and a knuckleboom crane replacing the overhead crane. The crew is increased to 148, and it was offered to the U.S. Navy as a replacement for the Littoral Combat Ship; the FY13 cost of an LCS was $446.3million compared to $735million for an NSC.

It adds a 12-cell Mk 56 VLS launcher for ESSM air-defense missiles, just behind the main gun, which is upgraded from 57mm to a 76 mm Super Rapid. Two quad launchers for Harpoon antiship missiles and a triple launcher for torpedoes are added to the stern. It retains the SeaRAM/Phalanx CIWS and 6 machine guns of other NSC variants. The stern is closed in and houses a towed-array sonar; a hull sonar is installed for mine countermeasures and an ESM suite. The original "National Patrol Frigate" concept had an AN/SPY-1F air-defense radar but by 2012 the PF 4921 was being shown with an Australian CEAFAR radar.

Brazil, Saudi Arabia, and Germany have also shown interest in NSC derivatives.

Ship list

Gallery

See also
Equipment of the United States Coast Guard
Offshore Patrol Cutter
USCG Seagoing Buoy Tender
USCG inland buoy tender

References

External links

National Security Cutter on Ingalls Shipbuilding's official website
National Security Cutter at USCG Acquisition Directorate site
National Security Cutter fact sheet

 
Patrol vessels of the United States
Ships of the United States Coast Guard